Trentepohlia aurea is a species of filamentous terrestrial green alga with a worldwide distribution. It grows on rocks, old walls and the trunks and branches of trees such as oaks, elms, and the Monterey cypress (Cupressus macrocarpa). The orange coloration results from carotenoid pigments in the algal cells. It is probably the most widespread and abundant species of Trentepohlia in the Britain and Ireland.

References

External links

 

Trentepohliaceae
Plants described in 1753
Taxa named by Carl Linnaeus